In number theory, Selberg's identity is an approximate identity involving logarithms of primes found by . Selberg and Erdős both used this identity to give elementary proofs of the prime number theorem.

Statement

There are several different but equivalent forms of Selberg's identity. One form is

where the sums are over primes p and q.

Explanation

The strange-looking expression on the left side of Selberg's identity is (up to smaller terms) the sum 

where the numbers 
 
are the coefficients of the Dirichlet series

This function has a pole of order 2 at s = 1 with coefficient 2, which gives the dominant term 2x log(x) in the asymptotic expansion of

Another variation of the identity

Selberg's identity sometimes also refers to the following divisor sum identity involving the von Mangoldt function and the Möbius function when :

References

Prime numbers
Mathematical identities